Eddie Palmer may refer to:

 Eddie Palmer (baseball) (1893–1983), third baseman in Major League Baseball
 Eddie Palmer (boxer), African American boxer